John Alexander McMillan III (born May 9, 1932) is a North Carolina Republican politician who served five terms in the U.S. House of Representatives, representing North Carolina's 9th congressional district from 1985 to 1995.

Biography 
McMillan, a native of Charlotte, North Carolina, graduated from Woodberry Forest School in Orange, Virginia. McMillan earned an A.B. in History from the University of North Carolina at Chapel Hill in 1954 and earned his M.B.A. from the University of Virginia.  While a student at UNC, McMillan joined the Sigma Alpha Epsilon fraternity.

After serving two years as an intelligence agent in the United States Army, McMillan worked in investment banking, was CFO of Ruddick Corp. from 1970 to 1976 and was CEO of Harris Teeter Super Markets from 1977 to 1983. He served on the Mecklenburg County board of commissioners and chaired its board of social services before being elected to Congress in 1984. He did not run for re-election in 1994. McMillan served for three years as Hipp Chair on the faculty of The Citadel.

References

External links

J. Alex McMillan Papers, Southern Historical Collection, UNC-Chapel Hill

1932 births
Living people
20th-century American politicians
American retail chief executives
University of North Carolina at Chapel Hill alumni
Republican Party members of the United States House of Representatives from North Carolina
American chief financial officers
The Citadel, The Military College of South Carolina faculty
Woodberry Forest School alumni
Politicians from Charlotte, North Carolina
People from Mecklenburg County, Virginia
Military personnel from North Carolina
Businesspeople from North Carolina
Members of Congress who became lobbyists